Sadchikov is a rural locality (a khutor) in Revolyutsionnoye Rural Settlement, Pallasovsky District, Volgograd Oblast, Russia. The population was 94 as of 2010. There are 2 streets.

Geography 
Sadchikov is located in steppe, on the Caspian Depression, 100 km southwest of Pallasovka (the district's administrative centre) by road. Prudentov is the nearest rural locality.

References 

Rural localities in Pallasovsky District